Kuttymama is a 2019 Indian Malayalam-language comedy-drama film directed by V. M. Vinu and starring Sreenivasan, Dhyan Sreenivasan, Durga Krishna, and Janardhanan in the leading roles.

Plot
 
A retired military service man nicknamed Kuttymama  has become a nuisance to others of his village because of his bragging nature. But later, the whole country flatter him positively.

Cast

 Sreenivasan as Major Shekarankutty aka Kuttymama 
 Dhyan Sreenivasan as Young Major Shekarankutty aka Young Kuttymama
 Krittika Pradeep
 Rony Raj as Doctor Vimal
 Janardanan 
 Shivaji Guruvayoor
 Manju Pathrose
 Bejoy Johnson 
 Sasi Kalinga as Tea Shop Owner 
 Santhosh Keezhattoor as Bank Manager Koshy
 Vinod Kovoor as marriage broker 
 Durga Krishna as young Anjali
 Meera Vasudev as Anjali
 Prem Kumar  
 Vishak Nair
 Nirmal Palazhi
 Indian Pallassery 
 Raghu 
 Kalabhavan Rahman as Taxi driver

References

External links
 
Kuttimama (Kuttymama) Cast & Crew, Kuttimama Malayalam Movie Cast, Actors, Actress

2010s Malayalam-language films
Films shot in Palakkad
2019 films